Gifton Ruben Elisha Noel-Williams (born 21 January 1980) is an English former footballer who played for Watford, Stoke and Burnley among other clubs. After a serious knee injury in 1999, he was affected by rheumatoid arthritis for much of the rest of his career. 

He retired from professional football in 2010 and moved into coaching, briefly managing Burnham in 2016 and Codicote in 2017 and was the interim manager of Watford Women. He is currently the manager of Real Kashmir.

Playing career
Born in Islington, Noel-Williams started his professional career at Watford where he spent a seven-year spell playing 127 games and scoring 43 goals. Aged 19, he was Watford's top goalscorer in the 1998–99 season, at the end of which they were promoted to the Premiership. However, his season ended in February 1999, when he seriously injured his knee after a challenge from Sunderland defender, Paul Butler. He had received his first call-up to the England Under-21 squad on the day of the game. Arthritis in both of his knees restricted him to just three appearances during Watford's single season in the Premiership.

Noel-Williams joined Stoke City on a free transfer on 2 June 2003, playing 83 games and scoring 23 goals in two years. He was Stoke's top goalscorer in the 2004–05 season, with 11 goals.

On 14 June 2005, Noel-Williams joined Burnley on a free transfer. He spent the latter part of the 2005–06 season on loan at Brighton & Hove Albion before returning to Burnley at the end of the season. He remained a Burnley player, despite being made available for a transfer throughout the close season, and, after an improvement in form was taken off the transfer list on 22 September 2006.

On 12 September 2006, Noel-Williams scored his first ever professional hat-trick in Burnley's 4–2 victory over Barnsley. He played 56 times for the Clarets scoring 7 goals, the last against Leeds United in November 2006.

On 31 January 2007, Noel-Williams joined Real Murcia for a fee of around £50,000, signing an 18-month deal and becoming only the second English player to represent the Spanish side, after Tom Thompson, who was player-coach in the 1920s. Upon Real Murcia's promotion to La Liga, Noel-Williams was transferred to Elche CF who finished 18 points behind Murcia in the Segunda División.

In 2008, Noel-Williams returned to England, signing a short-term contract with League One side Millwall. He was subsequently loaned to another club in the division, Yeovil Town

In January 2009, Noel-Williams moved to the United States to join American team Austin Aztex FC, signing a two-year contract. The club has a co-operation agreement with Noel-Williams' former club, Stoke City.

He was released by the Aztex at the end of the 2009 season, having made 16 appearances and scored three goals for the Texas club. He signed with the amateur DFW Tornados of the USL Premier Development League in 2010, but the club folded at the end of the 2010 season. 

In February 2015, after nearly five years out of football, Noel-Williams came out of retirement to sign for Southern Football League side Daventry Town, who were managed by his former Watford teammate Allan Smart.

Coaching career
In 2011, while still living in the United States, Noel-Williams was an assistant soccer coach at Brentwood Christian School, a private academy in Austin. Upon returning to England, he worked as a coach at Westfield Academy school in Watford, before being appointed as the Reserves and Under-18's manager at Northwood in June 2016. On 26 September 2016, Noel-Williams was announced as the new manager of the non-league club Burnham. In October, he signed his 18-year-old son Dejon, a youth team striker at Oxford United, on a work experience deal. He parted company with Burnham in November 2016, having struggled to combine the role with other coaching commitments. 

In June 2017, Noel-Williams was appointed manager of Codicote. He was sacked in November after the club lost 12 of their first 14 league matches. In October 2019, Noel-Williams was appointed assistant manager at Billericay Town, a position he held until June 2020. He has said that because of his race, unconscious bias may have played a part in limiting his coaching opportunities. 

In January 2021, Noel-Williams became a striker coach at Portsmouth on a part-time basis, in addition to his work for the Professional Footballers' Association. In December 2021, he was appointed interim manager of Watford Women.

On 16 August 2022, Noel-Williams was appointed as a coach supporting the England youth teams as part of The Football Association and Professional Footballers' Association's joint England Elite Coach Programme (EECP). In February 2023, he was appointed head coach of Indian I-League club Real Kashmir. In his very first match on 8 February, the "snow leopards" achieved 4–2 win against Sudeva Delhi.

Personal life
Born in England, Noel-Williams is of Grenadian descent. His father died when Gifton was 13. He became a father himself at the age of 16. His son Dejon Noel-Williams is also a professional footballer, and has represented the Grenada national football team.

Career statistics

References

External links

Austin Aztex bio
BBC Sport Article: Gifton's place in the sun
England stats at theFA

1980 births
Living people
Footballers from Islington (district)
Austin Aztex FC players
Brighton & Hove Albion F.C. players
Burnley F.C. players
DFW Tornados players
Daventry Town F.C. players
English footballers
English sportspeople of Grenadian descent
English expatriate footballers
Expatriate footballers in Spain
Association football forwards
Millwall F.C. players
Premier League players
Real Murcia players
Stoke City F.C. players
English Football League players
USL First Division players
USL League Two players
Yeovil Town F.C. players
Watford F.C. players
Southern Football League players
Black British sportsmen
England youth international footballers
Elche CF players
English football managers
Burnham F.C. managers
Codicote F.C. managers
English expatriate sportspeople in the United States
Expatriate soccer players in the United States
English expatriate sportspeople in India
Expatriate football managers in India
Association football coaches